The Calcutta National Medical College and Hospital (CNMCH),  colloquially known as Chittaranjan Hospital, is a 
leading public medical education and research institution in Kolkata. It was established by the amalgamation of the National Medical Institute (estd. 1921) and Calcutta Medical Institute.

Establishment 
The "Calcutta National Medical College" has its origin in the "National Medical Institute" or "Jatiya Ayurbigyan Vidyalaya" on 14 April 1921, founded as a product of the Non-cooperation movement. It was inaugurated by Netaji Subhas Chandra Bose. The College is locally known as Chittaranjan Hospital. Established in 1948, the institute was nationalized and  taken under the Ministry of Health & Family Welfare (West Bengal) in 1967. The college is accredited by the National Medical Commission (NMC). It was affiliated with the University of Calcutta till 2003. It is currently affiliated to the West Bengal University of Health Sciences(WBUHS).

The founder principal of the college was Dr Sundari Mohan Das.

Annual intake

 Paramedical – 73
 Undergraduate
MBBS : 250
Nursing : 50
 Post Graduate
Degree : 122
Diploma : 4
 Post Doctoral (Super-specialization) : 7

Departments

Non-clinical departments
 Department of Anatomy
 Department of Physiology
 Department of Biochemistry

Para-clinical departments
 Department of Pathology
 Department of Microbiology
 Department of Pharmacology
 Department of Forensic and State Medicine
 Department of Community Medicine/PSM

Clinical departments

 Department of Ophthalmology
 Department of ENT/Otorhinolaryngology
 Department of General Surgery
 Department of Orthopaedics
 Department of Gynaecology and Obstetrics
 Department of General Medicine
 Department of Paediatrics
 Department of Dermatology
 Department of Pulmonary/Chest Medicine
 Department of Physical Medicine & Rehabilitation 
 Department of Dentistry
 Department of Radiology
 Department of Radiotherapy
 Department of Psychiatry
 Department of Anaesthesiology
 Department of Cardiothoracic and Vascular Surgery
 Department of Paediatric Surgery
 Department of Plastic and Reconstructive Surgery
 Department of Neurosurgery
 Department of Urology
 Department of Neuro Medicine
 Department of Cardiology

Hospital 
Calcutta National Medical College (CNMC) is popularly known as Chittaranjan Hospital. The second campus of CNMC previously Calcutta Pavlov Hospital houses the psychiatry department. CNMC&H is one of the biggest government hospitals in West Bengal having extensive OPD, day care and indoor patient care services with more than 8,000 patients attending OPD every day. 
Total available bed strength is 1600. Calcutta National Medical College and Hospital ranked country’s best in maternity care and received the LaQshya Certificate from the Union health ministry, becoming the first medical institute in West Bengal to get it.

AGON – The annual cultural festival 
AGON is the annual cultural festival of Calcutta National Medical College, organised by the CNMC Students' Union. AGON is reportedly the biggest medical college festival of Eastern India. Since its inception in 1980 Agon has been one of the most sought after college festivals among the medical student fraternity in West Bengal. 
 Prefest  – Agon Prefest is held for 4–7 days prior to the main fest. Prefest events include: Intercollege Sports Tournament (cricket, football, volleyball, badminton, table tennis, carrom and chess), Cinefest, Short-Film Festival, Solo and group creative events, CME (Continued medical education), Seminars, Dance workshop, Medical workshops, Blood donation camps,  awareness campaigns etc.
 Fest  – Following the traditions of the past four decades the main fest Agon is held for 4 days. It begins just after the prefest. Events include: Dance & Music contests, Battle of Band, Crime Scene Investigation, Treasure Hunt, Medi Quiz, General Quiz, Fandom Quizzes (Harry Potter, Game of Thrones, Friends, DC-Marvel), Stand-Up comedy, Drama competition, Street Play, X-Factor (Colors of Bengal), Paradox – The Fashion Show etc. 
Among the major attractions of Agon are the 4 concert nights, which has regional artists, Bollywood celebrities, EDM concerts and DJ night. Agon has witnessed stellar  performances from Amit Trivedi, Arijit Singh, Neha Kakkar, Sunidhi Chauhan, KK (singer), Mohit Chauhan, Mohammed Irfan (singer) , Shalmali Kholgade, Shraddha Pandit, Fossils (band), Euphoria (Indian band), Javed Ali, Neeraj Shridhar, Rupankar, Anupam Roy, Sidhhu, Pota etc.

The cultural festival embraces the likes of many famous celebrities of the country, drawing about 5000 footfalls a day. With more than 40 inter college events and competitions spanning for more than a week, the fest is graced by more than 3000 college students, post graduate trainees, resident doctors, alumni of the college and faculty members. Students from more than 60 schools and colleges from Kolkata as well as from other parts of Eastern India take part in the competitions and attend the concerts. 
A number of social initiatives are undertaken by the Students' Union as part of the annual cultural festival AGON, which includes Blood donation camps,  Thalassaemia screening camps, awareness campaigns etc.

Calcutta National Medical College Students’ Union presents AGON has their android based mobile app named CNMCH AGON, which is the first time in India, a college event have their own app for event management and registration purposes. This app is made by the students of this medical institute.

See also

References

External links

 

Medical colleges in West Bengal
Affiliates of West Bengal University of Health Sciences
Educational institutions established in 1921
1921 establishments in India
1921 establishments in British India